Hal Blackwell is a financial analyst and author of the book Secrets of the Skim. A former wealth adviser for Merrill Lynch he speaks often about his time there; guest appearing on Fox Business Network and other media outlets as well as guest lecturing for the University of South Carolina Upstate.

His book Secrets of the Skim takes a behind the scene look at wealth management firms, and discusses the conflicts of interest financial advisers have with their clients among other things. Released in June 2010 it was the Hub City Writers Projects #5 pick for 2010. Blackwell is currently president of HE Blackwell Advisor, LLC a consulting firm located in Spartanburg, South Carolina.

References

External links

Living people
Year of birth missing (living people)
Place of birth missing (living people)
American financial writers
American financial analysts